Simon Greul and Alessandro Motti were the defending champions, but Greul chose to participate in Monte Carlo instead.
Motti partnered up with Rubén Ramírez Hidalgo, but they lost to Jorge Aguilar and Federico del Bonis in the first round.
Polish pair Tomasz Bednarek and Mateusz Kowalczyk won in the final 6–4, 7–6(4), against Jeff Coetzee and Jesse Witten.

Seeds

Draw

Draw

References
 Doubles Draw

Rai Open - Doubles
2010 Doubles